Ad Mela is a town in the Federally Administered Tribal Areas of Pakistan. It is located at 33°58'15N 70°12'29E with an altitude of 3475 metres (11404 feet).

References

Populated places in Khyber Pakhtunkhwa